Beridze is a Georgian surname. It is the most common surname in Georgia. Notable people with the surname include:

Avtandil Beridze (born 1955), Georgian politician
 Zurab Beridze (swimmer) (born 1979), Georgian swimmer
 Zurab Beridze (diplomat) (born 1958), Georgian diplomat
Giorgi Beridze (soccer player) (born 1997), Georgian soccer player

Georgian-language surnames
Surnames of Georgian origin